Arié Alimi (born 1977 in Sarcelles), is a French lawyer and a member of the Human Rights League (LDH).

Biography 
Son of a physiotherapist, of Algerian origin, Arié Alimi studied at the private Jewish school for boys Ozar Hatorah in Sarcelles until the third grade.

After a year at the Medical School (6th arrondissement of Paris) he decided to study law at Pantheon-Assas University where he obtained in 2000 a DESS degree in the laws of business and taxation. then a diploma in business legal counsel. He became involved during his years of study within the Union of Jewish Students of France.

In 2001 he joined the Paris Barrier - her sister was also a lawyer. He studied at the School for Advanced Studies in the Social Sciences
(EHESS), where he obtained a Master of Advanced Studies.

After working for Urbino et associés, he founded his firm specializing in commercial real estate law.

In January 2021, he published with Éditions du Seuil a book entitled The emergency coup: surveillance, repression and freedoms.

Private life 
He has claimed to be an atheist since the age of 18 but respects the dietary prescriptions of the Jewish religion under “tradition” and “culture”. He is the companion of Cécile Duflot.

Special cases 
Arié Alimi is specialized in cases of police violence.
 Rémi Fraisse's family 
 Case of journalist Taha Bouhafs.
 About twenty yellow vests,
 Case of Jean-Luc Mélenchon,

He is also the lawyer for rapper Sadek, and alert launcher and police officer Amar Benmohamed.

Works 
 Le coup d'État d'urgence : surveillance, répression et libertés, Éditions du Seuil, 2021.

References 

21st-century French lawyers
Human Rights League (France) members
Paris 2 Panthéon-Assas University alumni
1977 births
Living people